The best-known transgender flag, proposed in 1999, is a pride flag having five horizontal stripes of three colors—light blue, light pink and white. It was designed by American trans woman Monica Helms to represent the transgender community, organizations, and individuals.

Similar to the worldwide adoption of a number of identity-specific flags by the LGBT community around the world, including the Rainbow flag, the transgender pride flag is used throughout the world to represent the transgender community, though there are several other flags used and endorsed by varying transgender individuals, organizations and communities. There have been, and continue to be, alternatives suggested to these flags, and the varying flags have been and continue to be used to represent transgender pride, diversity, rights and/or remembrance by transgender individuals, their organizations, their communities and their allies.

Helms' design
The most prominent transgender flag design is the "Transgender Pride Flag", used as a symbol of transgender pride and diversity, and transgender rights. The flag was created by American trans woman Monica Helms in 1999, and was first shown at a pride parade in Phoenix, Arizona, in 2000.

The flag's design represents the transgender community, and consists of five horizontal stripes: two light blue, two pink, and one white in the center.

Helms describes the meaning of the transgender pride flag as follows:

Usage 
In the United Kingdom, Brighton and Hove council flies this flag on the Transgender Day of Remembrance. Transport for London also flew the flag from London Underground's 55 Broadway Headquarters for the 2016 Transgender Awareness Week.

The flag was flown from the large public flagpole in San Francisco's Castro District (where the rainbow flag usually flies) for the first time on 19 and 20 November 2012 in commemoration of the Transgender Day of Remembrance. The flag-raising ceremony was presided over by local drag queen La Monistat.

On 19 August 2014, Monica Helms donated the original transgender pride flag to the Smithsonian National Museum of American History.

Philadelphia became the first county government in the US to officially raise the transgender pride flag in 2015. It was raised at City Hall in honor of Philadelphia's 14th Annual Trans Health Conference, and remained next to the US and City of Philadelphia flags for the entirety of the conference. Then-Mayor Michael Nutter gave a speech in honor of the trans community's acceptance in Philadelphia.

In January 2019, Virginia Representative Jennifer Wexton hung the transgender pride flag outside her office in Washington, D.C., in a move to show support for the transgender community. In March 2019, dozens of Democratic and independent members of Congress flew this flag outside their offices for Trans Visibility Week leading up to the International Transgender Day of Visibility.

The flag flew above US state capitol buildings for the first time on Transgender Day of Remembrance 2019. The Iowa State Capitol and California State Capitol displayed the flag.

An emoji version of the flag was added to the standard Emoji listing in 2020.

Variations
In addition to Helms' original transgender pride flag design, a number of communities have created their variation on the flag, adding symbols or elements to reflect aspects of transgender identity, such as the canton of the Flag of the United States being added to create a flag representing transgender American identity.

Alternative designs
Over the years, several transgender flags have been adopted by various transgender individuals, organizations and communities.

Pellinen design 

Jennifer Pellinen designed this flag, unaware of the more widely-used classic Helms design.
Pellinen describes it thusly:  

"I came up with the idea for the transgender flag a few years ago. At the time I did not know of any other flag designs. The design was created for TG pride. Another reason I made the flag is that most cross dressers are not gay. If they use the rainbow flag people will think they are gay. The colors on the flag are from top to bottom. Pink, light purple, medium purple, dark purple, and blue. The pink and the blue represent male and female. The 3 purple stripes represent the diversity of the TG community as well as genders other than male and female."

Israeli flag

A unique design is used in Israel by the transgender and genderqueer community. This flag has a neon green background (to stand out in public places) and a centred Venus, Mars, and Mars with stroke symbol in black to represent transgender people.

Lindsay design

In Ontario a flag known as the "Trans Flag", created by Ottawa graphic designer Michelle Lindsay, is used. It consists of two stripes, the top in Sunset Magenta representing female, and the bottom in Ocean Blue representing male, with a tripled Venus, Mars, and Mars with stroke symbol representing transgender people, overlaying them.

This Trans Flag was first used by the Ottawa-area trans community for Ottawa's 2010 edition of the Trans Day of Remembrance. This event included a ceremony in which the Ottawa Police unveiled and raised this flag. The ceremony was repeated during the 2011 Ottawa and Gatineau editions of the Trans Day of Remembrance, this time joined by the Ottawa Paramedics, Ottawa City Hall and Gatineau City Hall also raising the Trans Flag during their own ceremonies. The list of groups doing official unfurling/raising of the Trans Flag in the Ottawa-Gatineau area as part of their Trans Day of Remembrance has grown each year. The Trans Flag has also been used as part of the Peterborough Pride Parade.

Andrew design

In 1999, San Francisco trans man Johnathan Andrew, under the moniker of "Captain John" on his female-to-male trans website "Adventures in Boyland", designed and published a flag for those within the transgender community. This trans pride flag consists of seven stripes alternating in light pink and light blue separated by thin white stripes and featuring, in the upper left hoist, a twinned Venus and Mars symbol in lavender. The repeated explanation of the color symbolism for Monica Helms' more well-known flag design is remarkably similar/almost identical to that of the description of Andrew's design on other pages. The original description for Andrew's trans pride flag read:

Andrew explained his motivation for creating the flag in 2017:

Kaleidoscope
In 2014, a new transgender flag known as the "Trans Kaleidoscope" was created by members of the Toronto Trans Alliance (TTA). It was raised at the first Transgender Day of Remembrance ceremony at Toronto City Hall on 20 November 2014. It was selected by TTA members for this occasion, via a vote, over Monica Helms' Transgender Pride flag and Michelle Lindsay's Trans Flag. This vote caused debate, which is the primary source of this flag's notability, as some scorned the choice for a relatively unknown flag. The flag has not received significant usage since the event.

The Trans Kaleidoscope is described on the TTA web site as representing "the range of gender identities across the spectrum", with the individual colours representing:

Pink: women/femaleness
Purple: those who feel their gender identity is a combination of male and female
Green: those who feel their gender identity is neither male nor female
Blue: men/maleness
Yellow: intersex

"The new white symbol with a black border is an extension of the Trans symbol with the male and female symbols, a combined symbol representing those with a gender identity combining male and female and a plain pole (with neither arrow nor bar) representing those with a gender identity that is neither male nor female, embodying awareness and inclusion of all."

See also
 LGBT symbols
 List of transgender-related topics
 List of transgender-rights organizations
 Transgender rights movement

References

External links

LGBT flags
Activism flags
Transgender culture
Flags introduced in 1999